Gadberry is an unincorporated community in Adair County, Kentucky, United States.  Its elevation is 951 feet (290 m).

A post office operated in the community from 1884 to 1858.  Gadberry was named for early settler James Gadberry.

References

Unincorporated communities in Adair County, Kentucky
Unincorporated communities in Kentucky